The Richmond Chapel, Lancashire Act 1772 was an Act of the Parliament of Great Britain "for completing a Building intended for a new Church or Chapel at Richmond, Everton, in the County Palatinate of Lancashire and for other purposes."

The Act enabled to finish the building of St Anne's Church as a chapel of ease in Richmond, a location near Everton, Liverpool.

References

Great Britain Acts of Parliament 1772
History of Liverpool